The United Minorities was a political party in inter-war Lithuania representing the Belorussian, German, Jewish and Russian minorities.

History
The party contested only one election in 1923, receiving 11% of the vote and winning ten seats in the Seimas. Seven seats went to the Jewish faction, two to the German faction and one to the Russian faction.

References

Belarusian diaspora in Europe
Defunct political parties in Lithuania
German diaspora in Europe
Jews and Judaism in Lithuania
Russian diaspora in Europe